Newfoundland Island is a small island off of the coast of Labrador near the mouth of Sandwich Bay. To the east lies Farrels Island, which is connected to Newfoundland Island at low tide. In 1884 Farrels Island was populated. Further to the east lies Independent Island and together the islands form Independent Harbour To the west lies Pigeon Island and to the northwest Pickens Island and Packs Harbour Islands.

Many locals still know this island as "Prisoner's Island."

References

Islands of Newfoundland and Labrador